"Right Back at It Again" is the second track and the first single from A Day to Remember's fifth album, Common Courtesy (2013). In October 20, 2015, the song was featured in Activision rhythm-music game, Guitar Hero: Live.

Music and lyrics
Vocalist, Jeremy McKinnon wrote the lyrics, while the music was written by McKinnon, former guitarist Tom Denney, guitarist Neil Westfall and producer Andrew Wade. "Right Back at It Again" almost wasn't included on the album as it was one of the excess songs the band had recorded, "we realised that it sounded great, so on it went."

Release and reception
"Right Back at It Again" was announced on October 7, 2013 to be broadcast as part of BBC Radio 1's Rock Show the following midnight, with the band calling the song their "brand new single". The song impacted radio on November 11. "Right Back at It Again" charted at number 33 on the Alternative Songs chart, and at number 40 on the Modern Rock chart in the U.S. McKinnon, Westfall and guitarist Kevin Skaff performed a surprise acoustic show for Warped Tour 2013 UK on November 17, and another acoustic set, this time at Banquet Records the following day, both in London; band played "Right Back at It Again" on both occasions.

Tamsyn Wilce for Alter the Press! noted that the way "Right Back at it Again" follows on from opening track "City of Ocala" "continues the catchy hardcore beats" that is present in all of the band's albums. Rock Sound's Andy Ritchie called the song "unmistakably the 'All I Want' of 'Common Courtesy'". A music video for the song was released on 19 December 2013.
The music video was nominated for Best Video at the Kerrang! Awards.

Track listing
Promotional CD
"Right Back at It Again" (alternative edit)
"Right Back at It Again" (active rock edit)

Personnel
Personnel per digital booklet.

A Day to Remember
Jeremy McKinnon — lead vocals
Josh Woodard — bass guitar
Neil Westfall — rhythm guitar
Alex Shelnutt — drums 
Kevin Skaff — lead guitar and vocals

Production
Jeremy McKinnon, Andrew Wade, Chad Gilbert — producers
Andrew Wade – engineer
Ken Andrews – mixing
Ted Jensen – mastering

Chart positions

References
Citations

Sources

 

2013 songs
2013 singles
A Day to Remember songs
Song recordings produced by Chad Gilbert
Song recordings produced by Andrew Wade
Song recordings produced by Jeremy McKinnon
Songs written by Jeremy McKinnon